During the 2008–09 English football season, Charlton Athletic competed in the Football League Championship. It was their second consecutive season at this level since relegation from the Premier League at the end of the 2006–07 season.

Season summary
Charlton were tipped to make a strong challenge for promotion, but it all went wrong for the Addicks and by the time manager Alan Pardew was sacked in November the club was in serious danger of a second relegation in three seasons. He was replaced with former Colchester United manager Phil Parkinson, but he was unable to save Charlton from falling into English football's third tier for the first time since 1981, coming in last place, 12 points adrift of safety.

Players

First-team squad
Squad at end of season

Left club during season

References

Notes

Charlton Athletic F.C. seasons
Charlton Athletic